Hening is a surname. Notable people with the surname include:

 Thomas S. Hening (1871–1934), American medical doctor and Democratic politician
 William Waller Hening (1768–1828), American attorney, legal scholar, publisher and politician

See also
 Chris (footballer) (born 1978), born Christian Maicon Hening, Brazilian footballer
 Henin, surname
 Henning (disambiguation)